The Ford Fiesta Rally3 is a rally car developed and built by M-Sport to Group Rally3 regulations for use at tier 3 of the Rally Pyramid. It is based upon the Ford Fiesta road car and debuted in 2021.

Competition history
The car was debuted by Estonian driver Ken Torn at SM O.K. Auto-Ralli in Finland, finishing eleventh overall. The car made its WRC debut at the 2021 Croatia Rally, with Zoltan Laszlo behind the wheel.

The Fiesta Rally3 made its WRC return during 2021 Rally Estonia, driven by Extreme E regular Molly Taylor with Sebastian Marshall co-driving. The crew crashed out on SS5.

As of 2022, the car is used as the selected vehicle for 2022 World Rally Championship-3 Junior. It's also the only vehicle in the Rally3 class so far.

References

External links

 
 Ford Fiesta Rally3 at eWRC-results.com

All-wheel-drive vehicles
Ford Fiesta
Ford Rally Sport vehicles
Rally3 cars